Clifford Lampe is a Professor in the School of Information at the University of Michigan. He is best known for his research in the fields of human-computer interaction, social computing, and computer supported cooperative work. Since 2018 he has been Executive Vice President for ACM SIGCHI. Lampe made foundational contributions in the areas of social networking sites, social capital, and online communities, work that has been cited over 34,000 times according to Google Scholar.

Education
Cliff Lampe was born in Michigan and attended Kalamazoo College for his undergraduate studies. He received a Ph.D. at the University of Michigan in 2006 in the School of Information where he was advised by Paul Resnick. His thesis examined the effects of comment ratings on site participation on the website Slashdot. After graduating from the University of Michigan, Lampe became an assistant professor at Michigan State University in the College of Communication Arts and Sciences.

Research, teaching, and service
Lampe currently advises graduate and undergraduate students in the areas of online harassment, incivility online, and civic engagement online. He has developed a citizen interaction course that partners students with local communities to design technologies that support community needs. Lampe received a grant from the National Science Foundation in 2009 to pursue his work on "the role of social network sites in facilitating collaborative processes". He received a grant from the University of Michigan Third Century Initiative in 2013 to support his Citizen Interaction project.

He is a frequent consultant, speaker, and guest lecturer on topics related to social media and online behavior. He is regularly cited in the press on topics like fake news, privacy, and trolling. He was the technical program chair for the 2016 ACM SIGCHI Conference on Human Factors in Computing Systems and the General Co-Chair for the 2022 ACM SIGCHI Conference.

Awards
In 2014, Lampe received the Joan Durrance Community Engagement Award for his Citizen Interaction Design program.

In 2013, Lampe (with Eytan Adar and Paul Resnick) received a Google Award for his "MTogether: A Living Lab For Social Media Research" project.

Selected works
 2007. "The benefits of Facebook "friends:" Social capital and college students' use of online social network sites". (with Nicole Ellison and Charles Steinfeld)
 2008. "Social capital, self-esteem, and use of online social network sites: A longitudinal analysis". (with Charles Steinfeld and Nicole Ellison)
 2004. "Slash (dot) and burn: distributed moderation in a large online conversation space". (with Paul Resnick)

References

Living people
University of Michigan School of Information alumni
Kalamazoo College alumni
University of Michigan faculty
Human–computer interaction researchers
Social computing researchers
Year of birth missing (living people)